Mathura Road is a road in Delhi and a part of the  NH 2 (Delhi-Howrah) Highway. Some of it is part of the Grand Trunk Road passing through Faridabad, and it leads right up to the holy town of Mathura, the birthplace of Lord Krishna. In 1723 people from the Mathura Colony in then Faridabad flocked and took refuge in the slums of this area. Over time they established themselves as a dominant pressure group and won numerous battles against the overarching nascent Tughlaq regimes. The etymology of Mathura Road is believed to have its roots in these transformations. 

Further down the road stand the National Zoological Park Delhi, Purana Qila and Pragati Maidan, which was Delhi's largest convention and exhibition space. 

The grave of poet Bedil, lies in a garden called Bagh-e-Bedil (Garden of Bedil) situated across Purana Qila, at Mathura Road.

Architectural monuments on Mathura Road
 Purana Qila, Delhi
 Khairul Manzil mosque, opposite Purana Qila.
 Sher Shah Gate, and the remains of the fort of Sher Shah Suri
 Bāġ-e Bīdel (Garden of Bīdel), the grave of Abdul-Qādir Bīdel
 Pragati Maidan, a venue for exhibitions and conventions 
 Sabz Burj
Humayun's Tomb

References 

Roads in Delhi